Jonas Scholz (born 24 January 1999) is a German professional footballer who plays as a centre-back for Fortuna Köln.

Career
Scholz made his professional debut for 1. FC Kaiserslautern in the 3. Liga on 20 July 2019, starting against SpVgg Unterhaching before being substituted out in the 78th minute for Gino Fechner, with the match finishing as a 1–1 home draw.

References

External links
 
 

1999 births
Living people
People from Roth (district)
Sportspeople from Middle Franconia
Footballers from Bavaria
German footballers
Association football central defenders
1. FC Kaiserslautern II players
1. FC Kaiserslautern players
FC 08 Homburg players
SC Fortuna Köln players
3. Liga players
Regionalliga players